Genevieve Louise Batterham  (19 January 1955 – 3 December 1995) was an Australian film maker, artist, writer and disability rights activist.

She was born Genevieve Whitford in the Sydney suburb of Paddington, and was educated at the Catholic girls' school Kincoppal School, where fellow students noted her rebellious streak. She then began studying at the art school of Macquarie University, but did not complete the degree.

In 1978, she began to notice the symptoms of multiple sclerosis, which was diagnosed soon afterwards—prompting an ultimatum to her partner, Perth camera operator Kim Batterham, to "leave her or marry her"—he chose the latter and they married in October 1978.

Multiple sclerosis quickly incapacitated her, and she channelled her anger at the resulting disability into producing a series of films chronicling her condition. The first, Pins and Needles, was directed by Barbara Chobocky and released in 1979, and was translated into five languages, winning several awards in 1980 including first prize at the New York Rehabilitation Film Festival and second prize at the Montreal Film Festival. Genni and Kim would then collaborate on three further films about the phases of her life: Where's the Give and Take? (1981), Artreach (1982), and Riding the Gale (1987).

In the 1984 Queen's Birthday Honours, Batterham was awarded the Medal of the Order of Australia (OAM) for her "service to people with disabilities".

References

External links

1955 births
1995 deaths
Australian disability rights activists
Australian documentary film producers
Australian women film producers
Recipients of the Medal of the Order of Australia
Neurological disease deaths in New South Wales
Deaths from multiple sclerosis
20th-century Australian women